James C. Wright is an American classical archaeologist and academic who specialises in the Aegean civilizations and Ancient Greece. Since 1998, he has been a professor in the Department of Classical and Near Eastern Archaeology of Bryn Mawr College. From July 2012 to July 2017, he additionally served as Director of the American School of Classical Studies at Athens.

Selected works

References

Living people
Classical archaeologists
Minoan archaeologists
Mycenaean archaeologists
Year of birth missing (living people)
Place of birth missing (living people)